Sorry to Disrupt the Peace is a 2017 novel by American writer Patty Yumi Cottrell. It concerns a woman, Helen, who lives in New York City but who returns to her home state of Wisconsin after the suicide of her adopted brother. The novel received positive reviews from critics. Cottrell has stressed that the novel is not autobiographical.

References

2017 American novels
Novels set in Wisconsin
Novels set in New York City
McSweeney's books